Gelophaula tributaria is a species of moth of the family Tortricidae. It is found in New Zealand.

The wingspan is about 25 mm. The forewings are dark fuscous with reddish scales and a broad irregular pale-yellow streak from the base to the apex. The hindwings are fuscous.

References

Moths described in 1913
Archipini
Moths of New Zealand